The Bitola Zoo, is a zoo in Bitola, North Macedonia. It was founded on 1 May 1950 with the help of zoos in Skopje, Zagreb, Belgrade and Subotica.

The Bitola zoo plays a significant role in the sphere of social living, especially in the sector of education as well as the protection of certain animal species. Ever since its establishment as an institution in 1950, the zoo has been constantly improving the conditions in order to meet European standards, but these standards have not yet been met. In 2004, a number of activities have started, aimed at improving the conditions in which the animals live and raising the educational character of the zoo.

Recent criticism
During recent year, harsh critic has been directed towards the zoo from organisations such as OIPA International and Animalia Ohrid. They are asking the Macedonian Government to close down the zoo due to allegations such as the use of stray dogs as food, and visitor testimonies and photos of unhappy and starving animals.

Gallery

References

External links

 

Bitola
Buildings and structures in Bitola
Tourist attractions in Bitola